Brakel is the name of several towns:

Brakel, Belgium, East Flanders, Belgium
Brakel, Germany, North Rhine-Westphalia, Germany
Brakel (Gelderland), Gelderland, Netherlands
Brakel (North Brabant), North Brabant, Netherlands

and of:
Braekel or Brakel, a breed of chicken